Kikutodden is a headland in Sørkapp Land at Spitsbergen, Svalbard. It is located between the coves Grunnvågen and Austerbogen and has a length of about 400 meters. 

The headland marks the southwestern point of Storfjorden.

References

Headlands of Spitsbergen